The Jupâneasa  is a left tributary of the river Bănița in Romania. It flows into the Bănița in Peștera.

References

Rivers of Romania
Rivers of Hunedoara County